Lake Alice is a lake in South Dakota, in the United States.

Lake Alice has the name of Alice Mosher, the daughter of a railroad official.

See also
List of lakes in South Dakota

References

Lakes of South Dakota
Lakes of Deuel County, South Dakota